The post-colonial copyright crisis of the mid-1960s is a particular phenomenon relating to the impact of the decolonisation process on former colonies (especially British colonies) in terms of literary publishing after the end of the Second World War. Previously education regimes in colonial countries had generally been under the control of the occupying power. The printing of educational texts took place in the occupying country, under copyright, most often to the specification of the relevant foreign ministry which would often produce texts with little in the way of knowledge that might lead to independent scientific or technological development.

Problems 

Domestic production of textbooks, especially those in indigenous languages, was severely restricted in several ways. The copyright regime, the capital costs and resources needed to set up and run a print mill and the lack of indigenous language material due to low literacy rates all contributed to an underdevelopment of the various post-colonial education systems once the decolonisation process was complete. UNESCO statistics show that in 1959, the Philippines and Burma each published 153 and 608 titles in their home languages respectively. A year later, statistics for India and Indonesia show 10,741 and 1,114 home language titles published respectively.

Shortage of learning materials in accessible languages soon presented the newly independent post-colonial governments with a problem. Due to the price-fixing actions of publishing cartels in London and New York, prices for educational materials, which were still under copyright, were far beyond the reach of ordinary people, and governments were unable to subsidise the quantity of books needed to construct a viable statewide education system. Pirating the necessary texts (a radical option) was also difficult, given a lack of printing presses, paper mills, and raw paper stock. Importing these materials also turned out to be prohibitively expensive.

Attempted solutions 

A solution was sought by developing nations in the form of attempts to change the terms of the Berne Convention for the Protection of Literary and Artistic Works of 1886, to which many now-independent nations had been signed up by their former colonial occupiers. Their continued membership of the convention was in itself a tricky international legal question due to their newly independent status - no independent government had ever signed the document.

The Stockholm Revision Conference of 1967 provided developing countries with a chance to change the rules in favour of copyright-importing states. This group of 24 nations especially sought more flexible terms on copyright for materials destined for educational purposes. However, negotiations stalled as a result of pressure from British publishing interests, who did not want to give up any degree of control over lucrative international markets.

A Protocol Regarding Developing Countries  was eventually agreed upon, but proved toothless, as it was non-binding. No developed, copyright exporting country signed or ratified it. Another opportunity arose four years later in 1971 at the Paris Revision Conference, where there was more success. Rather than risk losing members to the convention, a binding appendix was agreed upon which set out exceptions for developing countries. However, the effects were not far-reached, and problems with access to materials remained as student numbers grew.

References 

History of copyright law
Decolonization
Neocolonialism
Postcolonialism